Nodica is a village in Tuscany, central Italy,  administratively a frazione of the comune of Vecchiano, province of Pisa. At the time of the 2006 parish census its population was 2,870.

Nodica is about 11 km from Pisa and 1 km from Vecchiano.

References 

Frazioni of the Province of Pisa